Belgium participated in the Eurovision Song Contest 2004 with the song "1 Life" written by Dirk Paelinck and Marc Paelinck. The song was performed by Xandee. The Belgian entry for the 2004 contest in Istanbul, Turkey was selected through the national final Eurosong '04, organised by the Flemish broadcaster Vlaamse Radio- en Televisieomroeporganisatie (VRT). The competition featured twenty-eight competing entries and consisted of five shows. In the final on 15 February 2004, "1 Life" performed by Xandee was selected as the winner via the votes of five voting groups. 

As one of ten highest placed finishers in the 2003 contest, Belgium directly qualified to compete in the final of the Eurovision Song Contest which took place on 15 May 2004. Performing in position 13, Belgium placed twenty-second out of the 24 participating countries with 7 points.

Background

In 2003, Urban Trad represented the country with the song "Sanomi" and placed second in the final—Belgium's best result in the contest since their victory in 1986.

The Belgian broadcaster for the 2004 contest, who broadcasts the event in Belgium and organises the selection process for its entry, was Vlaamse Radio- en Televisieomroeporganisatie (VRT). The Belgian participation in the contest alternates between two broadcasters: the Flemish VRT and the Walloon Radio Télévision Belge de la Communauté Française (RTBF). Both broadcasters have selected the Belgian entry using national finals and internal selections in the past. In 2002, VRT organised the national final Eurosong in order to select the Belgian entry, while in 2003, RTBF internally selected both the artist and song that would represent the nation. On 19 September 2003, VRT confirmed Belgium's participation in the 2004 Eurovision Song Contest and announced that the Eurosong national final would be held to select their entry.

Before Eurovision

Eurosong '04 
Eurosong '04 was the national final that selected Belgium's entry in the Eurovision Song Contest 2004. The competition consisted of five shows that commenced on 18 January 2004 and concluded with a final on 15 February 2004 where the winning song and artist were selected. All shows took place at the Studio 100 in Schelle, hosted by Bart Peeters and broadcast on TV1.

Format 
Twenty-eight entries were selected to compete in Eurosong. Four semi-finals took place on 18 January 2004, 25 January 2004, 1 February 2004 and 8 February 2004 with each show featuring seven entries. The winner of each semi-final qualified to the final, and the three highest scoring second placed acts in the semi-finals were also selected to advance. The final took place on 15 February 2004 where the winner was chosen. The results of all shows were determined by an expert jury, an international jury, voting on Radio 2 and Radio Donna and public televoting. Each voting group had an equal stake in the result during all shows with the exception of the public televote which had a weighting equal to the votes of two groups. For the radio voting, listeners of the two stations was able to vote in advance prior to each of the five shows via televoting between Tuesday and Friday and their votes were combined with a jury consisting of representatives from the respective stations.

During each of the five shows, the expert jury provided commentary and feedback to the artists as well as selected entries to advance in the competition. The experts were:

 Dana Winner – singer
 Marcel Vanthilt – singer and television presenter
 André Vermeulen – Belgian commentator at the Eurovision Song Contest
 Serge Simonart – journalist at HUMO

Competing entries
A submission period was opened on 19 September 2003 for artists and songwriters to submit their entries until 24 November 2003. On 10 December 2003, VRT held a press conference at the Reyerslaan in Schaerbeek where the twenty-eight acts selected for the competition from a record number of 360 entries received during the submission period were announced. Among the competing artists were former Eurovision Song Contest participants Nicole and Hugo, who represented Belgium in 1973, and Barbara Dex, who represented Belgium in 1993.

Shows

Semi-finals
The four semi-finals took place on 18 January, 25 January, 1 February and 8 February 2004. In each show seven entries competed and the combination of results from two jury groups, two radio voting groups and a public televote determined the winner that qualified to the final. The three highest scoring second placed acts in the semi-finals also proceeded to the final.

Final 
The final took place on 15 February 2004 where the seven entries that qualified from the preceding four semi-finals competed. The winner, "1 Life" performed by Xandee, was selected by the combination of results from two jury groups, two radio voting groups and a public televote.

Ratings

At Eurovision

It was announced that the competition's format would be expanded to include a semi-final in 2004. According to the rules, all nations with the exceptions of the host country, the "Big Four" (France, Germany, Spain and the United Kingdom) and the ten highest placed finishers in the 2003 contest are required to qualify from the semi-final in order to compete for the final; the top ten countries from the semi-final progress to the final. As Belgium finished second in the 2003 contest, the nation automatically qualified to compete in the final on 15 May 2004. On 23 March 2004, a special allocation draw was held which determined the running order and Belgium was set to perform in position 13 in the final, following the entry from Bosnia and Herzegovina and before the entry from Russia. Despite being considered a favourite to win the whole competition, Belgium placed twenty-second in the final, scoring 7 points.

The semi-final and the final were broadcast in Belgium by both the Flemish and Walloon broadcasters. VRT broadcast the shows on TV1 with commentary in Dutch by Bart Peeters and André Vermeulen. RTBF televised the shows on La Une with commentary in French by Jean-Pierre Hautier. All shows were also broadcast by VRT on Radio 2 with commentary in Dutch by Michel Follet and Sven Pichal, and by RTBF on La Première with commentary in French by Patrick Duhamel and Serges Otthiers. The Belgian spokesperson, who announced the Belgian votes during the final, was Martine Prenen.

Voting 
Below is a breakdown of points awarded to Belgium and awarded by Belgium in the semi-final and grand final of the contest. The nation awarded its 12 points to the Netherlands in the semi-final and to Turkey in the final of the contest.

Points awarded to Belgium

Points awarded by Belgium

References

External links
 Belgian National Final page

2004
Countries in the Eurovision Song Contest 2004
Eurovision